The 1961 Davis Cup was the 50th edition of the Davis Cup, the most important tournament between national teams in men's tennis. 28 teams entered the Europe Zone, 7 teams entered the Americas Zone, and 7 teams entered the Eastern Zone. Ecuador, Indonesia and Morocco made their first appearances in the tournament.

The United States defeated Mexico in the America Zone final, India defeated Japan in the Eastern Zone final, and Italy defeated Sweden in the Europe Zone final. In the Inter-Zonal Zone, the United States defeated India in the semifinal, and then Italy defeated the United States in the final. In the Challenge Round Italy were defeated by the defending champions Australia. The final was played at Kooyong Stadium in Melbourne, Australia on 26–28 December.

America Zone

Draw

Final
United States vs. Mexico

Eastern Zone

Draw

Final
India vs. Japan

Europe Zone

Draw

Final
Italy vs. Sweden

Inter-Zonal Zone

Draw

Semifinals
India vs. United States

Final
Italy vs. United States

Challenge Round
Australia vs. Italy

References

External links
Davis Cup Official Website

 
Davis Cups by year
Davis Cup
Davis Cup
Davis Cup
Davis Cup
Davis Cup